Sibynophis melanocephalus, commonly known as the black-headed collared snake or Malayan many-toothed snake, is a nonvenomous species of colubrid snake found in Thailand,
Malaysia, Indonesia, Singapore, and Vietnam.

References

Sibynophis
Reptiles of Thailand
Reptiles of Malaysia
Reptiles of Indonesia
Reptiles of Singapore
Reptiles of Vietnam
Reptiles described in 1834
Taxa named by John Edward Gray
Reptiles of Borneo